Cinémaginaire is a Canadian film production company. The company is based in Montreal, Quebec, Canada and is headed by co-founders Denise Robert, who serves as president and Daniel Louis, who serves as vice president.

External links 
 Profile from Telefilm Canada
   Interview with Denise Robert.
 BFI: Cinémaginaire profile
 

Film production companies of Canada
Companies based in Montreal
Cinema of Quebec